Meromyza is a genus of flies in the family Chloropidae.

Species

M. acutata An & Yang, 2005
M. affinis Fedoseeva, 1971
M. americana Fitch, 1856
M. arizonica Fedoseeva, 1971
M. athletica Fedoseeva, 1974
M. balcanica Beschovski, 1996
M. bipunctata Fedoseeva, 1971
M. bohemica Fedoseeva, 1962
M. canadensis Fedoseeva, 1971
M. columbi Fedoseeva, 1971
M. communis Fedoseeva, 1971
M. congruens An & Yang, 2005
M. conifera Fedoseeva, 1971
M. curvinervis (Zetterstedt, 1848)
M. eduardi Hubicka, 1966
M. elbergi <small>'Fedoseeva, 1979</small>M. facialis Fedoseeva, 1979M. femorata Macquart, 1835M. flavipalpis Malloch, 1914M. frontosa Fedoseeva, 1971M. griseothorax Strobl, 1910M. hispanica Fedoseeva, 1971M. hungarica Dely-Draskovits, 1978M. ingrica Nartshuk, 1992M. laeta Meigen, 1830M. laurelae Fedoseeva, 1971M. lidiae Nartshuk, 1992M. marginata Becker, 1912M. modesta Fedoseeva, 1978M. mosquensis Fedoseeva, 1960M. mutabilis Fedoseeva, 1971M. neglecta Fedoseeva, 1974M. neimengensis An & Yang, 2005M. nigriseta Fedoseeva, 1960M. nigriventris Macquart, 1835M. obtusa Peterfi, 1961M. opacula Fedoseeva, 1978M. ornata (Wiedemann, 1817)M. palposa Fedoseeva, 1960M. pilosa Fedoseeva, 1971M. pleurosetosa Beschovski, 1987M. pluriseta Peterfi, 1961M. pratorum Meigen, 1830M. quadrimaculata Fedoseeva, 1961M. rara Fedoseeva, 1971M. rohdendorfi Fedoseeva, 1974M. rostrata Hubicka, 1966M. rotundata Hubicka, 1966M. rufa Fedoseeva, 1962M. sabroskyi Fedoseeva, 1971M. saltatrix (Linnaeus, 1761)M. sibirica Fedoseeva, 1961M. smirnovi Fedoseeva, 1964M. transbaicalica Fedoseeva, 1967M. triangulina Fedoseeva, 1960M. truncata Fedoseeva, 1971M. variegata Meigen, 1830M. virescens von Roser, 1840M. vladimirovae Fedoseeva, 1978 M. zachvatkini Fedoseeva, 1960M. zimzerla'' Nartshuk, 1992

References

Europe
Nearctic

Chloropinae
Chloropidae genera
Articles containing video clips